USS Mason has been the name of more than one United States Navy ship, and may refer to:

, a destroyer in commission from 1920 to 1922 and from 1939 to 1940
, a destroyer escort in commission from 1944 to 1945
, a destroyer in commission since 2003

See also

United States Navy ship names